The 27th Guldbagge Awards ceremony, presented by the Swedish Film Institute, honored the best Swedish films of 1991, and took place on 16 March 1992. Il Capitano: A Swedish Requiem directed by Jan Troell was presented with the award for Best Film.

Winner and nominees

Awards

Winners are listed first and highlighted in boldface.

References

External links
Official website
Guldbaggen on Facebook
Guldbaggen on Twitter
27th Guldbagge Awards at Internet Movie Database

1992 in Sweden
1991 film awards
Guldbagge Awards ceremonies
1990s in Stockholm
March 1992 events in Europe